Ryan Kinsley (born 25 September 1998) is an English speedway rider.

Career
Kinsley began his British career riding for the Kings Lynn junior team in 2015. In 2021, Kinsley rode in the top tier of British Speedway, riding for the King's Lynn Stars in the SGB Premiership 2021. 

In 2022, he rode for the Scunthorpe Scorpions in the SGB Championship 2022 and Mildenhall Fen Tigers during the 2022 National Development League speedway season.

References 

1998 births
Living people
British speedway riders
Buxton Hitmen riders
Kent Kings riders
King's Lynn Stars riders
Mildenhall Fen Tigers riders
Scunthorpe Scorpions riders